Mohammad Hasan Sharq (born 17 July 1925) is an Afghan former politician who was active in the communist government of Afghanistan. Sharq became Chairman of the Council of Ministers – the government of the Soviet-backed Democratic Republic of Afghanistan. He was selected as a compromise candidate after a loya jirga ratified a new constitution in 1987. However, the power of his office was relatively slight compared with the powers held by the Presidency.

Career 
Sharq served as spokesman for earlier Chairman of the Council of Ministers Mohammad Daoud Khan during the Kingdom of Afghanistan. When Daoud took over the Cabinet Posts of Prime Minister, Defense Minister and Foreign Minister, He appointed Sharq as his Deputy Prime Minister. He was Daoud's Minister of Finance from 1975 to about 1976.

In March 1986 Afghan foreign minister Abdul Wakil invited mujahideen leaders, former King Zahir Shah and ex-ministers from previous governments to join a government of national unity. The new parliament that convened on May 30, 1989, two weeks after the Geneva Accords became effective and the beginning of the Soviet troop withdrawal in 1989, consisted of 184 lower house deputies and 115 senators; 62 house and 82 senate seats were left vacant for the resistance "opposition." As a compromise candidate, Sharq was selected by President Mohammad Najibullah to be the new  Chairman of the Council of Ministers, replacing Sultan Ali Keshtmand. The appointment was intended dramatically to reinforce the point that the People's Democratic Party of Afghanistan (PDPA) was going to take a back seat. The new constitution, however, vested key powers in the Presidency and Najibullah did not give up that central role.

Sharq had served as the regime's Deputy Chairman of the Council of Ministers since June 1987 and before that as its Ambassador to India. Sharq's association with the Parcham faction, dating back to the Daoud government, made the "non-PDPA" appellation meaningless. Likewise, on June 7, when Sharq announced his cabinet, consisting of 11 new members and 10 former ones, the non-party credentials of the "new" ministers were undermined by the fact that most had served the regime government previously in other capacities. Furthermore, the powerful ministries of interior, state security, and foreign affairs remained in PDPA hands. The major exception was the effort to enlist a resistance commander or a respected retired general from an earlier era to become minister of defense. This post remained open for some time, but in August it was finally given to Army Chief of Staff General Shahnawaz Tanai of the Khalq faction.

Thus, almost two years after he announced the national reconciliation policy in January 1987, Najibullah was unable to attract a single major figure of the resistance or prominent Afghan refugee to join the government. During 1988 two new provinces were created - Sar-e Pol in the north and Nuristan in the northeast - by carving out territory from adjoining provinces. In each case, the purpose appears to have been to create a new entity where an ethnic minority, the Hazaras and Nuristanis respectively, would dominate. This readjustment would guarantee representation in the new parliament for these ethnic groups.  At the same time, the Sharq government abolished the special ministry for nationalities that carried connotations of a Soviet-style system. In February 1989 Sharq resigned from the government of Najibullah, a move underscoring the failure by Afghans to establish a government of national reconciliation. A resident of the Anar Dara district in the western Farah province, Sharq was prime minister in the Najibullah government from 1986 to 1990. He also served as spokesman for then prime minister Daud Khan and his Milli Ghurzang Party.

Cabinet

References 

1925 births
Living people
Ambassadors of Afghanistan to India
Finance Ministers of Afghanistan
Prime Ministers of Afghanistan
Afghan Tajik people